Dentisociaria is a genus of moths belonging to the family Tortricidae.

Species
Dentisociaria armata Kuznetsov, 1970

See also
List of Tortricidae genera

References

 , 1970, Ent. Obozr. 49: 449. 
 , 2005, World Catalogue of Insects 5.

External links
tortricidae.com

Archipini
Tortricidae genera